George Holland (born 6 May 1918) was an Australian tennis player. In 1938, tennis legend Don Budge said that, among the younger and less prominent players he had seen on his trip to Australia, Holland had the brightest future. "I have selected him after careful study of most of the leading young players. I watched many of them in match play during the Australian championships when they did not know I was about" said Budge, in an article in The Sydney Morning Herald on 14 February 1938. Budge went on to describe Holland's game by saying "he has a forceful service, hits his ground strokes with freedom and likes to chase them to the net, where he volleys and smashes severely, with just a dash of drop-volleys thrown in occasionally. And he possesses a splendid temperament. I summed him up as a clear-thinking lad with a heart as big as his happy outlook on life". George Holland made his debut in the Australian championships in 1937 and lost to Arthur Huxley in round one. At the 1938 Australian championships, 19 year old Holland beat Huxley 10–8 in the fifth set in round one. Then in round two Holland caused a big upset by beating reigning French champion and third ranked player in the world Henner Henkel after losing the first 2 sets. From the third set onwards, Holland "followed everything to the net and made some glorious volleys" and was in command of the match. "His groundstrokes had more penetration, he rarely missed his first serve, and he treated Henkel's cannon-balls in cavalier fashion to take command of the attack" according to The Argus. In the quarter finals, Holland lost in four sets to Adrian Quist.  In the first round of the 1939 Australian championships, Holland lost in round one to Vivian McGrath in straight sets. During World War II, Holland reached the rank of Lieutenant. After the war, Holland resumed his tennis career.

References

1918 births
Possibly living people
20th-century Australian people
Australian male tennis players
Tennis people from Victoria (Australia)